Goofs and Saddles is a 1937 American Western short subject film directed by Del Lord and starring the slapstick comedy team The Three Stooges (Moe Howard, Larry Fine and Curly Howard). It is the 24th entry in the series released by Columbia Pictures starring the comedians, who released 190 shorts for the studio between 1934 and 1959.

Plot
Set in the Old West, the Stooges are scouts for the United States Cavalry. They are sent by General Muster (Ted Lorch) to catch a gang of cattle rustlers, so they hide as bushes to try to find the gang's leader, Longhorn Pete (Stanley Blystone). However, the rustlers see past their disguises and shoot at the trio, forcing them to flee. The Stooges eventually wind up in Longhorn Pete's saloon, and the Stooges disguise themselves as gamblers and get into a card game with Pete as they wait for the cavalry.

Moe attempts to send a message to General Muster for help via carrier pigeon, but the pigeon returns to Pete, who reads the incriminating message aloud. The Stooges are forced to escape for their lives, jumping on a covered wagon filled with household equipment — and a monkey. The trio toss pots and pans from the wagon onto the ground, which the hoofs of the rustlers' horses catch them. The wagon loosens up from the horse team, and goes down in its own power until it stops.

The Stooges lock themselves within a small house, forcing the rustlers to use their guns on it from the outside. A bullet knocks off the monkey's hat, and he is forced to use a dipper as a helmet. Amidst the melee, Curly spots a meat grinder and decides to make a hamburger. The whizzing bullets accidentally topple a box of ammunition into the grinder, and the grinder becomes a makeshift Gatling gun. Discovering the chance, they add more ammunition and even a gun belt serving as an ad hoc ammunition belt. The increase in opposing firepower overwhelm the bandits until General Muster and his soldiers arrive and capture them. As the Stooges are given kudos for a job well done, the monkey goes to the grinder and twists the handle, firing a few shots that caused the three to be hit and flee the area.

Cast

Credited
 Moe Howard as Wild Bill Hiccup
 Larry Fine as Just Plain Bill
 Curly Howard as Buffalo Billious

Uncredited
 Stanley Blystone as Longhorn Pete
 Ted Lorch as General Muster
 Ethan Laidlaw as Tex
 Hank Mann as Lem
 Sam Lufkin as Colonel
 Eddie Laughton as Bartender
 Lew Davis, William Irving as Poker players
 Cy Schindell, Hank Bell, Blackie Whiteford, Jerome "Blackjack" Ward as gang members
 Ethelreda Leopold, Eve Reynolds, Elaine Waters as saloon girls

Production notes
The title Goofs and Saddles is a spoof of the term "hooves and saddles". Filming was completed on April 14–19, 1937.

The Stooges' names in this short are Buffalo Billious (Curly), Wild Bill Hiccup (Moe), and Just Plain Bill (Larry). The cultural references are to, respectively, American Old West figures Buffalo Bill and Wild Bill Hickok, and Just Plain Bill, an iconic radio soap opera of the era.

The chase sequence on horseback would be recycled in 1954's Pals and Gals.

This short has the smallest slap count. Moe smacks Curly softly on his head and he slaps Larry when he thought Larry pulled them off the horses after hitting a tree branch.

References

External links
 
 

1937 films
The Three Stooges films
American black-and-white films
Films directed by Del Lord
Columbia Pictures short films
American Western (genre) comedy films
1930s Western (genre) comedy films
American slapstick comedy films
1937 comedy films
1930s English-language films
1930s American films